Herman Wallace may refer to:

Herman C. Wallace (1924–1945), American soldier in World War II posthumously awarded the Medal of Honor
Herman Wallace, American prisoner known as one of the Angola 3; incarcerated for 41 years (1972–2013) in solitary confinement

See also
Wallace (surname)